Allemant may refer to the following places in France:

Allemant, Aisne, a commune in the department of Aisne
Allemant, Marne, a commune in the department of Marne